Brachystomellides is a genus of springtails belonging to the family Brachystomellidae.

Species:

Brachystomellides compositus 
Brachystomellides micropilosus 
Brachystomellides navarinensis 
Brachystomellides neuquensis

References

Collembola